Nilka García Solís (born November 14, 1981) is a Puerto Rican professional wrestler known as Black Rose or La Rosa Negra.

Professional wrestling career 
García began wrestling in Puerto Rico. She worked in World Wrestling Council (WWC) where she became WWC Women's Champion three times.

Ring Warriors 
On July 14, 2012 at Ring Warriors' Hollywood Heat Wave, Negra defeated Sienna DuVall and Su Yung to become the first RW Battling Bombshells Champion. Negra lost the title against DuVall on September 8, but she regained the title on September 29, 2012. Rosa retained the title for 3 years until March 28, 2015, when Negra lost the title against Santana Garrett in a match where Garrett's NWA Women's Championship was also on the line.

Shine (2013–present) 
Rose debuted in Shine at Shine 7 on February 22, 2013, in a three-way match won by Tina San Antonio, which also involved Luscious Latasha.

World Wonder Ring Stardom (2015, 2017) 
In August 2015, García, under the ring name Rosa Negra, made her Japanese debut by taking part in World Wonder Ring Stardom's 2015 5★Star GP tournament. After aligning herself with the Oedo Tai stable, Negra and stablemate Hudson Envy unsuccessfully challenged Io Shirai and Mayu Iwatani for the Goddess of Stardom Championship on September 5. On September 23, Negra defeated another stablemate, Star Fire, to win the High Speed Championship. She lost the title to Mayu Iwatani in her first defense on October 11.

Rosa Negra returned to Stardom in 2017, taking part in a tournament to crown the new Artist of Stardom Champions on April 15.

National Wrestling Alliance (2023–present) 
García, as La Rosa Negra, declared on the February 28, 2023 episode of NWA Powerrr, that she was utilizing her previouly earned Champions Series title opportunity to challenge Kamille for the NWA World Women's Championship at NWA 312.

Championships and accomplishments 
 Mission Pro Wrestling
 MPW Championship (1 time)
 MPW Championship Tournament (2020)
 Pro Wrestling Illustrated
 Ranked No. 48 of the best 50 female wrestlers in the PWI Female 50 in 2015
 Pro Wrestling Syndicate
 PWS Bombshells Championship (1 time)
 Majestic Twelve (2012)
 Ring Warriors
 Battling Bombshells Championship (2 times)
 Vendetta Pro Wrestling
 Luna Vachon Cup (2015)
 World Wonder Ring Stardom
 High Speed Championship (1 time)
 5★Star GP Award (1 time)
 5★Star GP Technique Award (2015)
 World Wrestling Council
 WWC Women's Championship (4 times)

References 

1981 births
Living people
21st-century professional wrestlers
Puerto Rican female professional wrestlers
Masked wrestlers
People from Dorado, Puerto Rico
High Speed Champions